Gule is a tribe of the Shilluk people in Northern Sudan. The primary language is Sudanese Arabic.

Ethnic groups in Sudan